Marek S. Huberath (pen name, born 1954) is a Polish professor of physics in the Jagiellonian University in Kraków and an award-winning science fiction and fantasy writer. His themes are philosophical, moral, and religious: how people become beasts or remain human in extreme circumstances. Many of his stories focus on death. Winner of the Zajdel Award in 1991 for a short story Kara większa and in 1997 for his novel Gniazdo Światów.

Works

Novels
Gniazdo światów (Nest of Worlds) (NOWA 2000) (English translation by Michael Kandel, Restless Books 2014)
Miasta pod skałą (Cities under the Rock) (Wydawnictwo Literackie 2005)
Vatran Auraio (Wydawnictwo Literackie 2010)
Zachodni portal Katedry w Lugdunum (Western Portal of the Cathedral in Lugdunum) (Wydawnictwo Literackie 2012)

Short story collections
Ostatni, którzy wyszli z raju (The Last to Leave Paradise) (Zysk i S-ka 1996)
Druga podobizna w alabastrze (Second Image in Alabaster) (Zysk i S-ka 1997)
Balsam długiego pożegnania (Balm of Long Farewell) (Wydawnictwo Literackie 2006)

Short stories
"Yoo Retoont, Sneogg. Ay Noo" translated by Michael Kandel on Words without Borders; in A Polish Book of Monsters (New York: PIASA Books, 2010)
"Balm of a Long Farewell" translated by Michael Kandel on Words without Borders

External links

 Michael Kandel, Climbing with Huberath
 Short story '"Yoo Retoont, Sneogg. Ay Noo." in English, translated by Michael Kandel
 Short story "Balm of a Long Farewell." in English, translated by Michael Kandel

1954 births
Living people
Academic staff of Jagiellonian University
Polish fantasy writers
20th-century Polish physicists
Polish science fiction writers